The Netherlands women's national cricket team, nicknamed the Lionesses, represents the Netherlands in international women's cricket. The team is organised by the Royal Dutch Cricket Association, which has been an associate member of the International Cricket Council (ICC) since 1966.

A Dutch women's team first played an international match in 1937, when Australia toured on its way to play a series in England. The team regularly played fixtures against English club sides over the following decades, but it was not until the early 1980s that regular international competition commenced. The Netherlands made its One Day International (ODI) debut in 1984, against New Zealand, and made its World Cup debut at the 1988 edition of the tournament, in Australia. Considered a top-level team from the late 1980s through to the early 2000s, the Netherlands participated in four consecutive World Cups between 1988 and 2000, and made the quarter-finals of the 1997 event. Since 2000, the Dutch side has not qualified for either the World Cup or the T20 World Cup, although it retained ODI status until the 2011 World Cup Qualifier. In 2007, the team played a one-off Test match against South Africa, joining Ireland as the only associate member of the ICC to play at that level.

In April 2018, the ICC granted full Women's Twenty20 International (WT20I) status to all its members. Therefore, all Twenty20 matches played between the Netherlands women and another international side since 1 July 2018 have been full WT20Is. In May 2022, the ICC announced the Netherlands as one of five women's sides to gain ODI status.  Papua New Guinea, Scotland, Thailand and the United States are the other four teams.

History

Early years

The Netherlands took part in women's international cricket from its earliest years. As early as 1937 they hosted the Australians on the first leg of their first ever Women's Ashes tour, before visiting England late the same year.

1980s

The Dutch team played their first ODI in 1984 against New Zealand. This was 12 years before the Dutch men's team played their first ODI. They lost that game by 67 runs, and were next seen in international cricket in 1988, playing in their first World Cup, in which they finished in last place. They finished third in the first European Championship in 1989.

1990s
They again finished third in the European Championship in 1990, and finished fourth the following year. The 1993 World Cup was again a disappointment, with another last place finish. 1995 saw them again finish third in the European Championship.

1997 was a busy year for the Dutch team, travelling to the Mikkelberg-Kunst-und-Cricket Center in Germany to play two ODIs against Denmark, a trip they repeated in 1998. They also visited Sri Lanka for a three match ODI series against the hosts, which they won 2–1, which remains their sole ODI series victory. This was followed by the World Cup, in which they avoided last place by reaching the quarter finals before being knocked out by Australia.

1999 saw another tour to Sri Lanka, where they lost the five match ODI series 5–0. This was followed by a last place finish in the European Championship in Denmark.

2000s
2000 saw the Dutch team's fourth and, to date, final World Cup appearance, where they again finished last. This was followed in 2001 by a tour to Pakistan where the hosts went 4–0 up in the seven match ODI series before the Netherlands won the final three games. Later in the year saw another third-place finish in the European Championship.

Their only cricket in 2002 was a three match ODI series against New Zealand, which saw three heavy defeats, two by more than 200 runs. The following year they hosted the 2003 IWCC Trophy, the inaugural edition of what is now the World Cup Qualifier. They needed to finish in the top two to gain qualification for the 2005 World Cup, but could only manage third place.

Their next international engagement was the European Championship in 2005, finishing in fourth place. 2006 saw a two match ODI series against Ireland, which they lost 2–0. The year did see some good news for them though, as the ICC announced that the top ten women's teams would have Test and ODI status. Their third-place finish in the IWCC Trophy in 2003, meant that the Dutch were included in this top ten. In February 2008 the Dutch women retained their test status for another four years by reaching the semi-final of the Women's Cricket World Cup Qualifier.

In December 2020, the ICC announced the qualification pathway for the 2023 ICC Women's T20 World Cup. The Netherlands were named in the 2021 ICC Women's T20 World Cup Europe Qualifier regional group, alongside five other teams.

After a Netherlands women's cricket team bilateral series in Thailand, in November 2022, the team were given their first ever WODI Ranking.

Squad
This lists all the players who have played for Netherlands for the past 12 months. Updated as of 1 July 2022.

Tournament history

Cricket World Cup

T20 World Cup

ICC Women's T20 World Cup Qualifier
 2013: 4th (DNQ)
 2015: 8th (DNQ)
 2018: 8th (DNQ)
 2019: 6th (DNQ)

ICC Women's World Twenty20 Europe Qualifier
 2019: 1st (Q)
 2021: 3rd (DNQ)

European Championship
1989: 3rd place
1990: 3rd place
1991: 4th place
1995: 3rd place
1999: 4th place
2001: 3rd place
2005: 4th place
2007: 3rd place
2009: Runner-up
2010: Runner-up
2011: Champions
2014: Runner-up

Records and Statistics 

International Match Summary — Netherlands Women

Last updated 3 December 2022

Women's Test cricket

Highest team total: 108 v South Africa, 28 July 2007 at Hazelaarweg Stadion, Rotterdam.
Highest individual score: 49, Violet Wattenberg v South Africa, 28 July 2007 at Hazelaarweg Stadion, Rotterdam.
Best innings bowling: 4/62, Jolet Hartenhof v South Africa, 28 July 2007 at Hazelaarweg Stadion, Rotterdam.

Women's Test record versus other nations

Records complete to Women's Test #130. Last updated 31 July 2007.

Women's One-Day International

Highest team total: 375/5 v Japan on 23 July 2003 at Sportpark Thurlede, Schiedam.
Highest individual score: 142, Pauline te Beest v Japan on 23 July 2003 at Sportpark Thurlede, Schiedam.
Best innings bowling: 5/20, Cheraldine Oudolf v Sri Lanka on 30 November 1997 at Asgiriya Stadium, Kandy.

Most ODI runs for Netherlands Women 

Most ODI wickets for Netherlands Women 

WODI record versus other nations

Records complete to WODI #1302. Last updated 26 November 2022.

Women's T20I cricket 

Highest team total: 196/3, v Germany on 27 June 2019 at La Manga Club Ground, Cartagena.
Highest individual innings: 126*, Sterre Kalis v Germany on 27 June 2019 at La Manga Club Ground, Cartagena.
Best innings bowling: 7/3, Frederique Overdijk v France on 26 August 2021 at La Manga Club Ground, Cartagena.

Most WT20I runs for Netherlands Women

Most WT20I wickets for Netherlands Women

WT20I record versus other nations

Records complete to WT20I #1309. Last updated 3 December 2022.

See also
 List of Netherlands women Test cricketers
 List of Netherlands women ODI cricketers
 List of Netherlands women Twenty20 International cricketers

References

 
Women's national cricket teams
Women
Women's cricket in the Netherlands
1937 establishments in the Netherlands